The Cuatro Ciénegas slider (Trachemys taylori) is a species of turtle belonging to the genus Trachemys of the family Emydidae.

Etymology
The specific name, taylori, is in honor of American herpetologist Edward Harrison Taylor.

Geographic range
T. taylori is endemic to the Cuatro Ciénegas Basin in the Coahuila state in northeastern Mexico.

Habitat
The preferred natural habitat of T. taylori is freshwater wetlands.

Conservation status
T. taylori is an endangered species.

References

Bibliography

Further reading
Legler JM (1960). "A New Subspecies of Slider Turtle (Pseudemys scripta) from Coahuila, México". Univ. Kansas Pub. Mus. Nat. Hist. 13 (3): 73–84. (Pseudemys scripta taylori, new subspecies).

Trachemys
Endemic reptiles of Mexico
Turtles of North America
Cuatrociénegas Municipality
Natural history of Coahuila
Endangered animals
Endangered biota of Mexico
Reptiles described in 1960